The Womack House is a historic house at 1867 South Ringo Street in Little Rock, Arkansas.  It is a single-story wood-frame structure, with a low-pitch gable roof, weatherboard siding, and a brick foundation.  A cross-gabled porch extends across the front, supported by sloping square columns.  The gable ends are supported by knee brackets, and the eaves have exposed rafter ends in the Craftsman style.  The house was built in 1922 for Dr. A. A. Womack, a prominent African-American doctor of the period.

The house was listed on the National Register of Historic Places in 1999.

See also
National Register of Historic Places listings in Little Rock, Arkansas

References

Houses on the National Register of Historic Places in Arkansas
Houses completed in 1922
Houses in Little Rock, Arkansas
National Register of Historic Places in Little Rock, Arkansas
Individually listed contributing properties to historic districts on the National Register in Arkansas